Route 270 or Highway 270 may refer to:

Canada
Manitoba Provincial Road 270
Prince Edward Island Route 270

Japan
 Japan National Route 270

United States
 Interstate 270 (multiple highways)
 U.S. Route 270
 California State Route 270
 Florida State Road 270 (former)
 Georgia State Route 270
 Hawaii Route 270
Kentucky Route 270
 Maryland Route 270
 Minnesota State Highway 270
 New York State Route 270
 Oklahoma State Highway 270
 Pennsylvania Route 270 (former)
 Tennessee State Route 270
 Texas State Highway 270 (former)
 Utah State Route 270
 Virginia State Route 270
 Washington State Route 270
 West Virginia Route 270
 Wyoming Highway 270